Tomáš Bagi (born 9 June 1991) is a Slovak football player who currently plays for TJ Slavoj Boleráz.

Club career
Bagi started his career in the youth ranks of ŠK Slovan Bratislava. He made his debut for ŠK Slovan Bratislava against FK Dukla Banská Bystrica on 6 April 2010.

External links

Eurofotbal.cz profile

References

1991 births
Living people
Footballers from Bratislava
Slovak footballers
Slovak expatriate footballers
Slovakia youth international footballers
Association football defenders
ŠK Slovan Bratislava players
ŠK Senec players
FC Nitra players
FC Urartu players
Armenian Premier League players
FK Iskra Borčice players
FK Dukla Banská Bystrica players
Slovak Super Liga players
2. Liga (Slovakia) players
4. Liga (Slovakia) players
Expatriate footballers in Armenia
Slovak expatriate sportspeople in Armenia